The 2008–09 Drake Bulldogs men's basketball team represents Drake University in the 2008-09 NCAA Division I men's basketball season. The team, which plays in the Missouri Valley Conference (MVC), is led by first-year head coach Mark Phelps. In 2007–08, the Bulldogs finished 28–5 (15–3 in the MVC). Drake will try to improve upon their first NCAA tournament appearance since 1971.

Preseason 
On April 21, 2008 Mark Phelps was named the head men's basketball coach at Drake University, succeeding Keno Davis.

Phelps will inherit a team that loses three starters—point guard Adam Emmenecker, shooting guard Leonard Houston, and small forward Klayton Korver. Emmenecker was one of the most compelling individual stories in the 2007–08 college season, going from three-year walk-on to MVC Player of the Year. Houston was a second-team all-MVC selection.

Returning starters are shooting guard Josh Young and power forward Jonathan "Bucky" Cox. Young, the team's leading scorer in 2007–08, joined Emmenecker on the all-MVC first team. Cox was the team's leading rebounder and joined Houston on the all-MVC second team.

Regular season 
Drake will host the Drake Iowa Realty Tournament on December 5–7, 2008
Drake will host the Drake Invitational on December 12–13, 2008. North Dakota State, Stephen F. Austin, and Texas-Pan American will be the participating schools. The January 28, 2009 game against Evansville was rescheduled as Evansville's plane was unable to take off due to weather. The game was scheduled to start at 7:05 p.m. CST.

Roster

Player statistics 
Note: GP= Games played; MPG= Minutes per Game; SPG= Steals per Game; RPG = Rebounds per Game; APG. = Assists per Game; BPG = Blocks per Game; PPG = Points per Game

Schedule

References 

Drake Bulldogs
Drake Bulldogs men's basketball seasons
Drake
Drake Bulldogs men's basketball
Drake Bulldogs men's basketball